George Chauncey (born 1954)  is a professor of history at Columbia University.  He is best known as the author of Gay New York: Gender, Urban Culture, and the Making of the Gay Male World, 1890–1940 (1994).

Life and works

Chauncey received his B.A. (1977) and Ph.D. (1989) in history from Yale University, where he studied with Nancy Cott and David Montgomery.  From 1991 to 2006, he taught in the Department of History at the University of Chicago, rising from assistant professor to full professor of history. In 2006, he joined the Yale faculty. He subsequently joined Columbia University's department of history in 2017. Chauncey additionally spent time as the director of the Columbia Research Initiative on the Global History of Sexualities, focusing on literature that researched gender and sexuality. George Chauncey is most well known for creating the popular text "Gay New York", which showed the public on a national scale the struggles that members of the LGBTQ+ community experienced on daily basis. However, what goes unnoticed are the actions and events Chauncey participated outside of his time as an author. Most notably, Chauncey spent time as an expert witness in thirty cases involving gay rights, some examples including Romer vs Evans (1996) and Lawrence vs Texas (2003). In his later years, Chauncey spent time working as a consultant on historical research projects as well as lecture series in New York City and Chicago. Chauncey's activism in gay right movements as well as creating powerful literature caused him to receive countless community and writing accolades that are tied to his historical legacy forever.

His book Gay New York: Gender, Urban Culture, and the Making of the Gay Male World, 1890–1940 (1994)  was published to mark the twenty-fifth anniversary of the Stonewall Rebellion. It combined social, political, and cultural history, and in it Chauncey argues that early twentieth century New York had a thriving, open gay culture. Using newspaper accounts from a wide variety of mainstream and underground publications, the archives of reform organizations, police and court records, popular cartoons and caricatures, guidebooks, and maps, Chauncey offers a rich and textured account of urban gay life. The book was acclaimed for several original findings, among them the malleability of sexual identities (he finds, for example, widespread acceptance of homosexual practices among working-class, heteronormative men), the use of house concerts as covers for sexual activity, a discussion of the "pansy craze", and the relative novelty of the category of "closeted" gay men. According to Chauncey, it was not until the 1930s and afterward that a strict regime of policing gay male sexuality emerged. It was in this period, he contends, that homosexual behavior began to move underground.

Chauncey wrote a historical defense of gay marriage. In the 1990s he was doing interviews and collecting material for a history of gay New York from the mid-twentieth century to the present.  This work has yet to be published.

Chauncey is best known in the public eye for his accomplishments as a literature writer. His first national accolade was won in 1987, when he received the Samuel Golieb Fellowship in Legal History, New York University School of Law. This fellowship awards young law students and historians research support to help fund their projects and literature work. In 1992, Chauncey spent time serving on the American Council of Learned Societies, which is a non profit organization that provides fellowships and scholarships for young aspiring students in history and other educational fields. In 1996 George Chauncey also spent time serving on the National Humanities Center, which is a non-profit organization that focuses on building the study of humanities at a national level. In 1997, Chauncey was the recipient of the Sprague Todaes Literary Award for his book "Gay New York", which rewards authors who create a powerful piece of work on LGBTQ+ history.

As time passed and the twenty first century began, George Chauncey continued to win national awards. In 2000, Chauncey was the recipient of the very first James Brudner Memorial Award in Lesbian and Gay Studies during his time teaching at Yale University. The purpose of this award is to bring national spotlight to Chauncey's accomplishments and breakthroughs in the LGBTQ+ field of history. In 2004, Chauncey received the Community Service Award, Lesbian Community Cancer Project in Chicago, which rewarded his work in offering support and one on one conversations with lesbian women battling cancer. Between the years 2005 and 2007, George Chauncey was elected to serve as a member of both Society of American Historians (2005) as well as the New York Academy of History (2007). Chauncey's legacy as both a historian and gay civil rights activist made him a popular choice amongst the public and his peers.

Expert testimony 

In addition to the literature awards and involvement in high-level academics, what typically goes unnoticed is George Chaunceys role in the LGBTQ+ groups fight for equality. Chauncey has testified as an expert witness in over thirty major gay rights cases, and he was the organizer and lead author of the Historians' Amicus Brief in Lawrence v. Texas (2003), which weighed heavily in the Supreme Court's landmark decision overturning the nation's remaining sodomy laws. In that brief, Chauncey argued for the historical specificity of understandings of sodomy, challenging the reasoning in Bowers v. Hardwick (1986) that antisodomy laws were an enduring feature of the American legal system.

Chauncey most notably testified as an expert witness in the California Proposition 8 case, Perry v. Schwarzenegger, on behalf of the successful plaintiffs. In the Perry case, the Court found him to be "qualified to offer testimony on social history, especially as it relates to gays and lesbians." The court recounted his academic qualifications, citing his CV, his authorship of books, and original research using primary sources. The decision cited Chauncey's testimony on a dozen issues of fact or points of law that were relevant to the case.

Another public case Chauncey contributed to os the Romer vs. Evans case. This situation occurred on May 20, 1996 in the state of Colorado. In this scenario, voters in Colorado chose to instill the 2nd Amendment, which discriminated members of the LGBTQ+ community from receiving judicial or legislative action (protection) from the federal government. This gay civil rights movement ensued, and members of the LGBTQ+ ended up winning the trial against the state of Colorado in a 6-3 decision. It was determined that the 2nd amendment was in fact discriminatory against a certain group, therefore causing the supreme court to overturn the ruling. George Chauncey served as an expert witness in the case, helping members of the jury come to a conclusion that the federal government was unfairly treating the gay community. This shows that Chauncey's participation in the LGBTQ+ civil rights movement extended further beyond his literature, but included physical activism in civil court cases.

Works 
Gay New York: Gender, Urban Culture, and the Making of the Gay Male World, 1890–1940. Basic Books, 1994. 478 pp. 
Why Marriage?  The History Shaping Today's Debate Over Gay Equality. Basic Books, 2005. 224 pp.

References 

 Richardson, Kalia. 2022. "The Historian George Chauncey Wins the Kluge Humanities Prize."
 This source dives into Chauncey's achievements surrounding his LGBTQ studies.
 Hond, Paul. 2022 "Honoring George Chauncey, a Scholar of Gay History". Columbia Magazine
 This source researches the life of Chauncey, and his work completed as a writer.
 Stack, Brian. Boag, Peter. 2018. "George Chauncey's Gay New York: A view from 25 years later". Cambridge University
 This source provides a relatively non-bias viewpoint of George Chauncey's book Gay New York, and how it was received from an audiences perspective.
 Chicago LGBT Hall of Fame. 1999. Lesbian Community Community Cancer Project
 This source provides information regarding Chauncey's time volunteering in the Lesbian Community Community Cancer Project.
 Freedberger, Peter. NYU Law. "Golieb Fellowship in Legal History"

Further reading

External links 
 Chauncey's Yale History Department page
 Cover story on Chauncey in the University of Chicago alumni magazine
 Washington Post op-ed "What Gay Studies Taught the Court" on how historians helped overturn Bowers v. Hardwick

Yale University faculty
21st-century American historians
21st-century American male writers
Historians of LGBT topics
LGBT historians
1953 births
Living people
University of Chicago faculty
Yale College alumni
American gay writers
Columbia University faculty
American male non-fiction writers
Yale Graduate School of Arts and Sciences alumni